Władysław Szaryński (born 17 January 1947) is a Polish footballer. He played in two matches for the Poland national football team in 1970.

References

External links
 

1947 births
Living people
Polish footballers
Poland international footballers
Place of birth missing (living people)
Association footballers not categorized by position